Tistarite is an exceedingly rare mineral with the formula Ti2O3, thus being the natural analogue of titanium(III) oxide. In terms of chemistry it is the titanium-analogue of hematite, corundum, eskolaite, and karelianite. Other minerals with the general formula A2O3 are arsenolite, avicennite, claudetite, bismite, bixbyite, kangite, sphaerobismoite, yttriaite-(Y) and valentinite. Tistarite and grossmanite - both found in the famous Allende meteorite (so is kangite) - are the only currently known minerals with trivalent titanium. Titanium in minerals is almost exclusively tetravalent. The only known terrestrial occurrence of tistarite was found during minerals exploration by Shefa Yamim Ltd. in the upper mantle beneath Mount Carmel, Israel.

References

Oxide minerals
Titanium minerals
Trigonal minerals
Minerals in space group 167